The men's heptathlon event at the 2003 All-Africa Games was held on October 13–14.

Results

References

Heptathlon